The Blériot 118 was a 1920s French amphibian flying-boat fighter designed by Léon Kirste, only one was built and it was not ordered into production.

Design and development
The 118 was developed by Kirste from his earlier Blériot 101 project to meet a French naval requirement for a two-seat fighter.  The 118 was an amphibian flying-boat powered by two Hispano-Suiza 8Ab piston engines.  First flown on 23 January 1925 it was tested by the Navy in competition with other designs but was rejected for being unstable in flight.

Specifications

See also

References

Notes

Bibliography

1920s French fighter aircraft
Flying boats
118
High-wing aircraft
Amphibious aircraft
Aircraft first flown in 1925
Twin piston-engined tractor aircraft